Fermín Sarmiento Torralba (born Fermín Torralba y Sarmiento; 1891–1939) was a Filipino lawyer and politician. He was a member of the Philippines Legislature from 1922 to 1928 and was Secretary of the Philippine Senate from 1931 to 1935. He was a member of the Nacionalista Party.

Fermín Torralba was born in Tagbilaran, Bohol to Margarito Torralba y Maturan (c. 1856 – January 11, 1929 in Tagbilaran, Bohol) and Cirila Sarmiento. He received an LL.B. degree from the University of Michigan.

Torralba was elected to the Philippines Legislature in 1922 as representative from the 1st district of Bohol and was re-elected in 1925. He was elected Secretary of the Philippine Senate in 1933, serving in the Ninth and Tenth Legislatures.

References

1891 births
1939 deaths
People from Tagbilaran
University of Michigan Law School alumni
Nacionalista Party politicians
Members of the House of Representatives of the Philippines from Bohol
Members of the Philippine Legislature